Pseudodineura is a genus of sawflies belonging to the family Tenthredinidae.

The species of this genus are found in Europe and Northern America.

Species:
 Pseudodineura clematidis (Hering, 1932)
 Pseudodineura clematidisrectae (Hering, 1935)

References

Tenthredinidae
Sawfly genera